Matthew J. Thornton (born September 15, 1976), is an American former professional baseball pitcher. Born in Three Rivers, Michigan he grew up and attended high school in Centreville. He played in Major League Baseball (MLB) for the Seattle Mariners, Chicago White Sox, Boston Red Sox, New York Yankees, Washington Nationals, and San Diego Padres. Thornton is second all-time in American League history in holds (182).

College and minor league baseball
In the 1995 MLB draft, Thornton was drafted by the Detroit Tigers in the 27th round (742nd overall) but chose not to sign with them. Thornton played college baseball for Grand Valley State University and was drafted by the Seattle Mariners in the first round (22nd overall) of the 1998 MLB draft.

Thornton made his professional debut with the Single-A Everett AquaSox in the Northwest League, recording a 27.00 ERA in two games. In , Thornton had a breakout year for the Single-A San Bernardino Stampede in the California League, where he posted a 14–7 record in 27 starts, along with a stellar 2.52 ERA and 192 strikeouts in only 157 innings pitched.

Thornton, still a starting pitcher, pitched well, making 12 starts and going 1–5 with a 3.63 ERA and 44 strikeouts in 62 innings pitched. In , Thornton was briefly sent back down to High-A ball with the Inland Empire 66ers of the California League, but was quickly promoted back up AA ball with the San Antonio Missions again. He started only four games, but posted an incredible 0.36 ERA, with a 3–1 record, gave up only eight hits in 25.1 innings of work and struck out 18 batters. His performance got him promoted that same year to AAA ball with the Tacoma Rainiers in the Pacific Coast League. Thornton had a shaky start to his career in Triple-A ball, starting two games and posting an 0–2 record and an 8.00 ERA.

Major Leagues

Seattle Mariners

2004
Thornton made his MLB debut on June 27, with the Mariners in a game against the San Diego Padres, pitching brilliantly over four innings, only allowing three hits and striking out one batter. Throughout the season, the Mariners used Thornton for mostly middle reliever duty, except for one game on July 10, when he started on against the Chicago White Sox. He pitched five innings, allowing four runs on three hits and walking seven batters in a loss. Thornton finished the 2004 season with a 1–2 record and 4.13 ERA in 19 games (one start), striking out 30 batters in 32.2 innings of work.

2005
In 2005, Thornton served his reliever duties, pitching in 55 games and going 0–4 with a 5.21 ERA. He struck out 57 batters in 57 innings pitched.

Chicago White Sox

2006
On March 20, Thornton was traded from the Seattle Mariners to the Chicago White Sox in exchange for outfielder Joe Borchard. Under the tutelage of pitching coach Don Cooper, Thornton emerged as a dominant bullpen force. In the 2006 season, Thornton appeared in 63 games, going 5–3 with two saves and a 3.33 ERA.

2007
Thornton's 2007 season was a little busier, as he made 68 relief appearances with a 4–4 record, two saves and a 4.79 ERA.

2008
Thornton made 74 appearances out of the bullpen in 2008, going 5–3 with one save and a 2.67 ERA.

2009
Thornton made 70 appearances in 2009, going 6–3 with four saves and a 2.74 ERA.

2010
Thornton was selected by the coaches' vote to the American League All-Star team in 2010, the first All-Star selection of his career. In 2010, he made 61 appearances, going 5–4 with eight saves and a 2.67 ERA.

2011
Appearing in 62 games in 2011, Thornton went 2–5 with three saves and a 3.32 ERA.

2012
2012 was somewhat unlucky for Thornton, as his loss column led all relievers in baseball. He went 4–10 with three saves and a 3.46 ERA in 74 relief appearances.

2013
Thornton made 40 appearances for the White Sox to start the 2013 season, going 0–3 and a 3.86 ERA.

In 512 career relief appearances with the White Sox spanning 463.1 innings, Thornton compiled a 3.28 ERA. As of September 12, he led all eligible American League relievers with 12.3 strikeouts per nine innings.

From 2008 to 2013, Thornton pitched in more games than any other left-handed reliever.  He also holds the record for most holds with a single team, with 164 for the White Sox.

Boston Red Sox
On July 12, 2013, Thornton was traded to the Boston Red Sox for minor league outfielder Brandon Jacobs. The Red Sox also received cash considerations. For the rest of the 2013 season with the Red Sox, Thornton's playing time was limited due to an oblique strain, but he made 20 appearances out of the bullpen, going 0–1 with a 3.52 ERA. Overall in 2013, combined with both teams, Thornton made 60 total relief appearances going 0–4 and a 3.74 ERA. The Red Sox finished 97–65, making it to the postseason and eventually winning the World Series over the St. Louis Cardinals. Thornton, although he did not make any postseason appearances, still received his first career championship ring.

New York Yankees

On January 10, 2014, Thornton signed a two-year contract with the New York Yankees worth $7 million. In 46 games for the Yankees, Thornton was 0–3 with a 2.55 ERA. He was put on waivers late in the season in what General Manager Brian Cashman said was a move for "roster flexibility".

In 2014, Thornton reached second on the all-time list for holds in Major League Baseball, trailing only Arthur Rhodes.

Washington Nationals 
Thornton was claimed by the Washington Nationals after being waived by the Yankees in August, 2014. He pitched in 18 games for Washington down the stretch, going 1–0 and posting a perfect 0.00 ERA. Thornton appeared in three games in the 2014 National League Division Series against the San Francisco Giants, going 0–1 with a 3.86 ERA.  Thornton made 60 appearances for Washington in 2015, compiling a 2–1 record and a 2.18 ERA with 23 strikeouts in 41 innings.  Since 2005, Thornton had recorded the most innings of any left-handed reliever.

San Diego Padres 

On March 3, 2016, Thornton signed a minor league deal with the San Diego Padres with an invitation to Spring training. He was designated for assignment on August 6, 2016.

Retirement
On November 8, 2016, Thornton announced his retirement from professional baseball.

Pitching style
Since transitioning to the bullpen with the White Sox, Thornton has scrapped his secondary pitches and now relies heavily on a mid- to upper-90s four-seam fastball. In 2010, Thornton has thrown the fastball over 90% of the time. He also occasionally throws a slider, which he uses most effectively against right-handed batters. His fastball command is considered excellent.

References

External links 

Matt Thornton Yahoo Stats

1976 births
Living people
American League All-Stars
Baseball players from Michigan
Boston Red Sox players
Chicago White Sox players
Everett AquaSox players
Grand Valley State Lakers baseball players
Inland Empire 66ers of San Bernardino players
Lake Elsinore Storm players
Major League Baseball pitchers
New York Yankees players
People from Three Rivers, Michigan
Peoria Javelinas players
San Antonio Missions players
San Bernardino Stampede players
San Diego Padres players
Seattle Mariners players
Tacoma Rainiers players
Washington Nationals players
Wisconsin Timber Rattlers players
World Baseball Classic players of the United States
2009 World Baseball Classic players